Ludmila Semenyaka is a Soviet ballerina, born in Leningrad. She joined the Kirov Ballet in 1970 and later the Bolshoi Ballet in 1972, where she was a prima ballerina. She was named People's Artist of the USSR in 1986 and received the USSR State Prize.

See also

 List of Russian ballet dancers

External links
The Ballerina Gallery - Ludmila Semenyaka
Biography at Yandex 

Prima ballerinas
Russian ballerinas
People's Artists of the USSR
Dancers from Saint Petersburg
1952 births
Living people
Soviet ballerinas
Vaganova graduates
20th-century Russian ballet dancers